The 1979–80 NHL season was the 63rd season of the National Hockey League. This season saw the addition of four teams from the disbanded World Hockey Association as expansion franchises. The Edmonton Oilers, Winnipeg Jets, New England Whalers (later renamed "Hartford Whalers" at the insistence of the Boston Bruins), and Quebec Nordiques joined the NHL, bringing the total to 21 teams. The other two WHA teams (Birmingham Bulls and Cincinnati Stingers) were paid to disband.

The New York Islanders won their first Stanley Cup, defeating the Philadelphia Flyers in six games, in the finals.

The season also marked the eighth and final season for the Flames in Atlanta before the franchise relocated to Calgary. The NHL would return to the Georgia capital in 1999 with the Thrashers, but that team would ultimately relocate away from Atlanta as well becoming the second (and current) incarnation of the Winnipeg Jets.

The collapse of the WHA also saw the much hyped super-star rookie Wayne Gretzky come to the NHL with the Edmonton Oilers. Gretzky would tie Marcel Dionne for the scoring lead with 137 points and capture the Hart Memorial Trophy as the most valuable player while Dionne took home the Art Ross Trophy as the leading scorer by virtue of having scored two more goals.  Gretzky aside, many players made their debut in the NHL this season, both due to the WHA merger and to a change in the rules for the Entry Draft allowing eighteen- and nineteen-year-olds to be drafted for the first time; no fewer than seven Hall of Famers (Gretzky, Ray Bourque, Mark Messier, Mike Gartner, Michel Goulet, Mark Howe, and an undrafted Joe Mullen) debuted this season, along with numerous other perennial stars.

The big story of the regular season was the record-breaking undefeated streak compiled by the Philadelphia Flyers. After starting the season with a 5–2 win over the New York Islanders and a 9–2 loss to the Atlanta Flames, the Flyers did not lose again for nearly three months, earning at least one point in every game between a 4–3 win over Toronto on October 14, 1979, and a 4–2 win over Buffalo on January 6, 1980, earning a 35-game record of 25–0–10. This stands as the longest undefeated streak in North American professional sports history.

Regular season
With 21 teams in the league, the regular-season schedule was set without regard to divisional affiliation. Each team played each of the other 20 teams four times in the year, twice at home and twice on the road. As well, a new playoff structure was introduced with the four division winners plus the next 12 teams with the best records qualifying. Division winners were not granted any byes and the divisions were ignored for determining playoff match-up seeding. Thus the division grouping ensured that if the five worst teams were to be in the same five-team division, the winner of this division would have qualified for the playoffs despite having the fifth worst season record. Except for that unlikely possibility, the divisional affiliations were irrelevant and had no effect on playoff qualification or seeding. A few months into the season, the Detroit Red Wings started playing at Joe Louis Arena after having spent all but their first season at the Detroit Olympia.

For the four previous seasons, the Boston Bruins had owned first place in the Adams Division. This season saw the Buffalo Sabres dethrone the Bruins in the Adams. The New York Islanders finished first overall in the NHL the previous season with 116 points, but lost in the playoffs semifinals to the upstart New York Rangers. This season saw them fall considerably in the standings as they finished fifth overall with 91 points, a full 25 points below last year's finish. On the other hand, the Philadelphia Flyers improved by 21 points from the previous season. Their 35-game undefeated streak (25–0–10) propelled them to the best record in the NHL with 116 points.

All four expansion teams finished poorly with records below .500. The Hartford Whalers fared the best with 73 points and the Winnipeg Jets tied the Colorado Rockies for last overall with 51 points. Hartford (14th overall) and Edmonton (16th overall) qualified for the playoffs, but both teams were swept 3 games to 0 in their respective first-round playoff series.

Rule changes
In August 1979, John Ziegler, the NHL president, announced that protective helmets were made mandatory for all NHL players. "The introduction of the helmet rule will be an additional safety factor", he said. The only exception were for players who signed their pro contracts prior to June 1, 1979. Those players under the exception who chose not to wear a helmet also had to sign a waiver form, if they so desired. At the time of the rule change, about 70% of NHLers were wearing helmets already. The first player to wear protective headgear on a regular basis was George Owen of the Boston Bruins in the 1928–29 season. Prior to that, the only time protective headgear was worn was to temporarily protect injuries. Craig MacTavish, while playing for the St. Louis Blues, was the last helmetless player, retiring after the 1996–97 season.

Final standings
Note: GP = Games played, W = Wins, L = Losses, T = Ties, Pts = Points, GF = Goals for, GA = Goals against, PIM = Penalties in minutes

Note: Teams that qualified for the playoffs are highlighted in bold

Prince of Wales Conference

Clarence Campbell Conference

Playoffs

With the league expansion from 17 to 21 teams, the playoffs were also expanded, from a 12-team tournament to a 16-team tournament. The sixteen teams were composed of the four divisional champions plus the top 12 finishers of the remaining 17 teams. The 16 qualifying teams were then seeded based on regular season points, with divisional rankings ignored. Division leaders no longer received first round byes. The teams were seeded 1 through 16, with the top team playing the 16th team in the first round, and so on.  In subsequent rounds, matchups were similarly arranged, with the top remaining seed against the lowest remaining seed, and so on. The Preliminary Round was a best-of-five set. The Atlanta Flames played their final playoff games in this postseason, and moved to Calgary soon after. The playoffs returned to Atlanta in 2007.

Playoff seeds

The sixteen teams that qualified for the playoffs are ranked 1–16 based on regular season points.

 Philadelphia Flyers, Patrick Division champions, Clarence Campbell Conference regular season champions – 116 points
 Buffalo Sabres, Adams Division champions, Prince of Wales Conference regular season champions – 110 points
 Montreal Canadiens, Norris Division champions – 107 points
 Boston Bruins – 105 points
 New York Islanders – 91 points
 Minnesota North Stars – 88 points
 Chicago Black Hawks, Smythe Division champions – 87 points
 New York Rangers – 86 points
 Atlanta Flames – 83 points
 St. Louis Blues – 80 points
 Toronto Maple Leafs – 75 points
 Los Angeles Kings – 74 points
 Pittsburgh Penguins – 73 points (30 wins)
 Hartford Whalers – 73 points (27 wins)
 Vancouver Canucks – 70 points
 Edmonton Oilers – 69 points

Playoff bracket

Stanley Cup Finals

The story of the playoffs was Mike Bossy and the New York Islanders. After a dismal start for their franchise in the early seventies, the Islanders built a contender for the Stanley Cup and won their first of four in a row by beating the Philadelphia Flyers in overtime of game six of the final. Defenceman Denis Potvin scored a crucial overtime goal in game one and the Cup was won when Bobby Nystrom scored the Cup-winning goal from John Tonelli and Lorne Henning at 7:11 of the first overtime. Ken Morrow became the first hockey player in history to win an Olympic gold medal and the Stanley Cup in the same season. Hall of Fame announcer Dan Kelly was calling the play-by-play for CBS Sports on that day, May 24, 1980, which was the last NHL game to air on American network television for nearly ten years.

Awards

All-Star teams

Player statistics

Scoring leaders
Note: GP = Games played; G = Goals; A = Assists; Pts = Points

Source: NHL.

Leading goaltenders

Note: GP = Games played; Min = Minutes played; GA = Goals against; GAA = Goals against average; W = Wins; L = Losses; T = Ties; SO = Shutouts

Other statistics
Plus-minus leader:  Jim Schoenfeld, Buffalo Sabres

Coaches

Patrick Division
Atlanta Flames: Al MacNeil
New York Islanders: Al Arbour
New York Rangers: Fred Shero
Philadelphia Flyers: Pat Quinn
Washington Capitals: Gary Green

Adams Division
Boston Bruins: Fred Creighton and Harry Sinden
Buffalo Sabres: Scotty Bowman
Minnesota North Stars: Glen Sonmor
Quebec Nordiques: Jacques Demers
Toronto Maple Leafs: Floyd Smith, Dick Duff and Punch Imlach

Norris Division
Detroit Red Wings: Bobby Kromm and Ted Lindsay
Hartford Whalers: Don Blackburn
Los Angeles Kings: Bob Berry
Montreal Canadiens: Bernie Geoffrion and Claude Ruel
Pittsburgh Penguins: Johnny Wilson

Smythe Division
Chicago Black Hawks: Eddie Johnston
Colorado Rockies: Don Cherry
Edmonton Oilers: Glen Sather
St. Louis Blues: Barclay Plager and Red Berenson
Vancouver Canucks: Harry Neale
Winnipeg Jets: Tom McVie and Bill Sutherland

Milestones

Debuts
The following is a list of players of note who played their first NHL game in 1979–80 (listed with their first team, asterisk(*) marks debut in playoffs):
Bob Gould, Atlanta Flames
Kent Nilsson §, Atlanta Flames
Paul Reinhart, Atlanta Flames
Pekka Rautakallio §, Atlanta Flames
Pat Riggin §, Atlanta Flames
Brad McCrimmon, Boston Bruins
Craig MacTavish, Boston Bruins
Ray Bourque, Boston Bruins
Mike Ramsey, Buffalo Sabres
Rob McClanahan, Buffalo Sabres
Keith Brown, Chicago Black Hawks
Rich Preston §, Chicago Black Hawks
Terry Ruskowski §, Chicago Black Hawks
Darryl Sutter, Chicago Black Hawks
Rob Ramage §, Colorado Rockies
John Ogrodnick, Detroit Red Wings
Mike Foligno, Detroit Red Wings
Jim Korn, Detroit Red Wings 
Kevin Lowe, Edmonton Oilers
Mark Messier §, Edmonton Oilers
Wayne Gretzky §, Edmonton Oilers
John Garrett §, Hartford Whalers
Gordie Roberts §, Hartford Whalers
Mark Howe §, Hartford Whalers
Mike Rogers §, Hartford Whalers
Mark Hardy, Los Angeles Kings
Jay Wells, Los Angeles Kings
Curt Giles, Minnesota North Stars, 
Craig Hartsburg §, Minnesota North Stars
Tom McCarthy, Minnesota North Stars
Chris Nilan, Montreal Canadiens
Keith Acton, Montreal Canadiens
Gaston Gingras §, Montreal Canadiens
Rick Meagher, Montreal Canadiens
Richard Brodeur §, New York Islanders
Ken Morrow, New York Islanders
Duane Sutter, New York Islanders
Brian Propp, Philadelphia Flyers
Michel Goulet §, Quebec Nordiques
Jamie Hislop §, Quebec Nordiques
Real Cloutier §, Quebec Nordiques
Mike Liut §, St. Louis Blues
Joe Mullen*, St. Louis Blues
Laurie Boschman, Toronto Maple Leafs
Rick Vaive §, Vancouver Canucks
Mike Gartner §, Washington Capitals
Dave Christian, Winnipeg Jets

Players marked with § previously started their major professional career in the World Hockey Association.

Last games
The following is a list of players of note that played their last game in the NHL in 1979–80 (listed with their last team):
Curt Bennett, Atlanta Flames 
Paul Henderson, Atlanta Flames
Gerry Cheevers, Boston Bruins
Dave Schultz, Buffalo Sabres
Keith Magnuson, Chicago Black Hawks
Stan Mikita, Chicago Black Hawks
Cliff Koroll, Chicago Black Hawks
Gary Croteau, Colorado Rockies
Tom Webster, Detroit Red Wings
Dave Dryden, Edmonton Oilers
Bill Flett, Edmonton Oilers
Al Hamilton, Edmonton Oilers
Gordie Howe, Hartford Whalers (The last player to be born in the 1920s and the last player to have played in the 1940s)
Bobby Hull, Hartford Whalers (The last player to be born in the 1930s)
Andre Lacroix, Hartford Whalers
Syl Apps, Jr., Los Angeles Kings 
Barry Gibbs, Los Angeles Kings 
Randy Manery, Los Angeles Kings
Jocelyn Guevremont, New York Rangers
Dale Tallon, Pittsburgh Penguins
Pierre Plante, Quebec Nordiques
Carl Brewer, Toronto Maple Leafs
Dennis Hextall, Washington Capitals
Gary Smith, Winnipeg Jets

See also 
 List of Stanley Cup champions
 1979–80 NHL transactions
 1979 NHL Entry Draft
 1979 NHL Expansion Draft
 32nd National Hockey League All-Star Game
 National Hockey League All-Star Game
 World Hockey Association
 List of WHA seasons
 Ice hockey at the 1980 Winter Olympics
 1979 in sports
 1980 in sports

References
 
 
 
 

Notes

External links
Hockey Database
NHL.com

 
1979–80 in Canadian ice hockey by league
1979–80 in American ice hockey by league